Housseyn Selmi (born 11 February 1993) is an Algerian footballer who plays as a midfielderfor Algerian Ligue Professionnelle 1 club CR Belouizdad.

Club career
Selmi made his professional debut with CA Batna in a 1-0 Algerian Ligue Professionnelle 1 loss to Olympique de Médéa on 20 August 2016.

References

External links
 
 NFT Profile
 FDB Profile

1993 births
Living people
People from Jijel
Algerian footballers
Algeria international footballers
CR Belouizdad players
CA Batna players
Algerian Ligue Professionnelle 1 players
Algerian Ligue 2 players
Association football midfielders
21st-century Algerian people